Yevgeniya Protsenko (born 25 November 1983) is a Russian water polo player. She competed in the women's tournament at the 2008 Summer Olympics.

See also
 Russia women's Olympic water polo team records and statistics
 List of women's Olympic water polo tournament goalkeepers
 List of World Aquatics Championships medalists in water polo

References

External links
 

1983 births
Living people
Sportspeople from Chelyabinsk
Russian female water polo players
Water polo goalkeepers
Olympic water polo players of Russia
Water polo players at the 2008 Summer Olympics
21st-century Russian women